Oleksandr Kratov (born 31 March 1985) is a Ukrainian orienteering competitor. He competed at the 2013 World Orienteering Championships, and won a bronze medal in the relay with the Ukrainian team.

He was born in Feodosia, but represents the club OK Orion in Sweden.

References

External links

 
 

1985 births
Living people
Ukrainian orienteers
Male orienteers
Foot orienteers
World Orienteering Championships medalists
Competitors at the 2017 World Games
Competitors at the 2022 World Games